Bruno Eduardo Rodríguez Parrilla (born 22 January 1958) is a Cuban diplomat and politician. He is a member of the Politburo of the Communist Party of Cuba, and has served as Cuba's Minister of Foreign Affairs since 2009.

Biography and career
Rodríguez was born in Mexico City to engineer José María Rodríguez Padilla who held high positions in the Cuban government. Rodríguez Parrilla served as Cuba's Permanent Representative to the United Nations from 1995 to 2003. He was appointed as Minister of Foreign Affairs on March 2, 2009, replacing Felipe Pérez Roque, after serving as the Vice-Minister. This was a result of the 2009 shake-up by Raúl Castro.

On October 25, 2011, Rodríguez Parrilla addressed the United Nations General Assembly right before the annual non-binding vote calling for the United States to end its embargo against Cuba.

On July 20, 2015, Rodríguez attended the reinauguration of the Cuban Embassy in Washington, D.C., making him the first Cuban Minister of Foreign Affairs to visit the United States on a diplomatic mission since 1958.

See also

List of foreign ministers in 2017
List of current foreign ministers

References
 The Miami Herald, Cuban Economy: Purge Aims to Halt Cuba's Economic Free Fall, Sunday March 8, 2009, Page 1A.
 St. Petersburg Times,  Raul Castro names his team,  March 3, 2009.
 Houston Chronicle, Raul Castro shakes up his Cabinet Some Cuban leaders loyal to Fidel are ousted, March 3, 2009.
 Cubavision TV, Havana,  Cuban state council announces cabinet reshuffle, March 2, 2009
 The Miami Herald, Cuba: New Foreign Minister Expected to Set New Tone, Tuesday, March 10, 2009, Page 6A

External links
https://web.archive.org/web/20090306080555/http://www.granma.cubaweb.cu/pdf/martes/pagina5.pdf
https://web.archive.org/web/20071011123545/http://wtopnews.com/?nid=105
https://abcnews.go.com/International/wireStory?id=6992631
https://www.reuters.com/article/worldNews/idUSTRE52868R20090309
https://web.archive.org/web/20090401152243/http://www.periodico26.cu/english/news_cuba/mar2009/official-note030209.html
https://web.archive.org/web/20090101182936/http://www.embacubalebanon.com/cur_min1.html

Foreign ministers of Cuba
Cuban diplomats
1958 births
Living people
Mexican people of Cuban descent
Cuban people of Mexican descent
Communist Party of Cuba politicians
Permanent Representatives of Cuba to the United Nations
Politicians from Mexico City
1990s in Cuba
2000s in Cuba
2010s in Cuba
20th-century Cuban politicians
21st-century Cuban politicians
Recipients of the Order of Prince Yaroslav the Wise, 3rd class